Ezgi Şenler (born 28 January 1993) is a Turkish actress.

Life and career 

Ezgi Şenler was born on 28 January 1993 in Ankara. At the age of 9, she studied ballet at the Ankara State Opera and Ballet Department for two years. She is a graduate of Hacettepe University Ankara State Conservatory with a degree in Modern Dance. She made her television debut in 2016 with a recurring role in the Kanal D series Bodrum Masalı. Şenler continued her career with the Star TV series Nefes Nefese before being cast in a leading role in the ATV series Canevim as Müjgan Haksever. In 2021, she was cast in a leading role in the action drama series Teşkilat.

Filmography

Television

Film

References

External links 

Living people
1993 births
Turkish film actresses
Turkish television actresses
Hacettepe University Ankara State Conservatory alumni